The Existence of God is a 1979 book by British philosopher of religion Richard Swinburne, claiming the existence of the Abrahamic God on rational grounds. The argument rests on an updated version of natural theology with biological evolution using scientific inference, mathematical probability theory, such as Bayes' theorem, and of inductive logic. In 2004, a second edition was released under the same title.

Swinburne discusses the intrinsic probability of theism, with an everlastingly omnipotent, omniscient and perfectly free God. He states various reasons for the existence of God, such as cosmological and teleological arguments, arguments from the consciousness of the higher vertebrates including humans,  morality, providence, history, miracles and religious experience. Swinburne claims that the occurrence of evil does not diminish the probability of God, and that the hiddenness of God can be explained by his allowing free choice to humans. He concludes that on balance it is more probable than not that God exists, with a probability larger than 0.5, on a scale of 0.0 (impossible) to 1.0 (absolutely sure).

Swinburne summarised the same argument in his later and shorter book Is There a God?, omitting the use of Bayes' theorem and inductive logic, but including a discussion of multiple universes and cosmological inflation in the 2010 edition.

Arguments in inductive logic
Central to the argument of Swinburne is the use of inductive logic. He defines a correct C-inductive argument as an argument where the premisses merely add to the probability of the conclusion, and a stronger correct P-inductive argument when the premisses make the conclusion probable with a probability larger than ½.

Probability of God according to theism using Bayes' theorem
Swinburne applies mathematical conditional probability logic to various hypotheses related to the existence of God
and defines 
 as the available evidence, 
 as the hypothesis to be tested, and 
 as the so-called "tautological" background knowledge.

The notation  is used for the conditional probability of an event  occurring given that another event  occurred previously. This is also termed the posterior probability of  given .

The probability of the present evidence  given background knowledge  can be written as the sum of the evidence with God existing (e and h) and the evidence without God (e and not h):

The probability of a universe of our kind, as evidenced by  without a single omnipotent god  can written as the sum of the probabilities of several optional hypotheses  without a god, i = 1, 2, 3:
 : There exist many gods or limited, non-omnipotent gods
 : There are no gods but there is an initial or everlasting state of a kind to bring the present state of the universe about
 : There is no explanation at all needed, with the universe always being as it is now.
The sum of probabilities becomes 

Swinburne then claims to refute these three hypotheses: 
  because theism should be simpler than many gods or gods of limited power. So theism has a much larger probability: 
  fails, because Swinburne believes an unextended physical point or any other starting points of universe, or an everlasting state are unlikely to produce the features of the universe. Theisme is more probable, so either  or 
  is refuted as well, because according to Swinburne, there is the "...overwhelming fact that each particle of matter throughout vast volumes of space should behave in exactly the same way as every other particle codified in laws of nature without there being some explanation of this is beyond belief."

Admittedly this hypothesis  can explain the present state of affairs in the universe - the evidence  - without the need of a God, that means the probability is 1.0: .

However, Swinburne estimates that the probability  given the background knowledge is infinitesimally low.

Then the sum of probabilities of the various hypotheses without God

 will not exceed
.

So , the posterior probability of theism or God  on the evidence  considered with background knowledge , will be ½ or more, by a "correct P-inductive argument". Swinburne states that it is impossible to give exact numerical values for the probabilities used.

Swinburne concludes that deductive proofs of God fail, but claims that on the basis of the above P-inductive argument theism is probably true. He notes that in his calculation the evidence from religious experience and historical evidence of life, death and resurrection of Jesus were ignored: its addition would be sufficient to make theism overall probable with a probability larger than ½.

Notes

References

External links
 

2004 non-fiction books
Books about spirituality
British non-fiction books
Christian devotional literature
Christian theology books
Clarendon Press books
English-language books
Oxford University Press books
Philosophy books
Philosophy of religion
1979 non-fiction books